Saxony-Anhalt is a state of Germany, bordering the states of Brandenburg, Saxony, Thuringia and Lower Saxony. It covers an area of 
and has a population of 2.18 million inhabitants, making it the 8th-largest state in Germany by area and the 11th-largest by population. Its capital is Magdeburg and its largest city is Halle (Saale).

The state of Saxony-Anhalt was formed in July 1945 after World War II, when the Soviet army administration in Allied-occupied Germany formed it from the former Prussian Province of Saxony and the Free State of Anhalt. Saxony-Anhalt became part of the German Democratic Republic in 1949, but was dissolved in 1952 during administrative reforms and its territory divided into the districts of Halle and Magdeburg. Following German reunification the state of Saxony-Anhalt was re-established in 1990 and became one of the new states of the Federal Republic of Germany.

Saxony-Anhalt is renowned for its rich cultural heritage and possesses the highest concentration of UNESCO World Heritage sites in Germany.

Geography
Saxony-Anhalt is one of 16 constituent states of Germany. It is located in the western part of eastern Germany. By size, it is the 8th largest state in Germany and by population, it is the 11th largest.

It borders four other states: Brandenburg to the north-east, Saxony to the south-east, Thuringia to the south-west and Lower Saxony to the north-west.

In the north, the Saxony-Anhalt landscape is dominated by the flat expanse of the North German Plain. The old Hanseatic towns Salzwedel, Gardelegen, Stendal and Tangermünde are located in the sparsely populated Altmark. The Colbitz-Letzlingen Heath and the Drömling near Wolfsburg mark the transition between the Altmark region and the Elbe-Börde-Heath region with its fertile, sparsely wooded Magdeburg Börde. Notable towns in the Magdeburg Börde are Haldensleben, Oschersleben (Bode), Wanzleben, Schönebeck (Elbe), Aschersleben and the capital Magdeburg, from which the Börde derives its name.

The Harz mountains are located in the south-west, comprising the Harz National Park, the Harz Foreland and Mansfeld Land. The highest mountain of the Harz (and of Northern Germany) is Brocken, with an elevation of 1,141 meters (3,735 ft). In this area, one can find the towns of Halberstadt, Wernigerode, Thale, Eisleben and Quedlinburg.

The wine-growing area Saale-Unstrut and the towns of Zeitz, Naumburg (Saale), Weißenfels and Freyburg (Unstrut) are located on the rivers Saale and Unstrut in the south of the state.

The metropolitan area of Halle (Saale) forms an agglomeration with Leipzig in Saxony. This area is known for its highly developed chemical industry (the Chemiedreieck – chemical triangle), with major production plants at Leuna, Schkopau (Buna-Werke) and Bitterfeld. Finally, in the east, Dessau-Roßlau and Wittenberg are situated on the Elbe (as is the capital Magdeburg) in the Anhalt-Wittenberg region.

Administrative subdivisions 

The capital of Saxony-Anhalt is Magdeburg. It is the second-largest city in the state, closely after Halle (Saale). From 1994 to 2003, the state was divided into three regions (Regierungsbezirke), Dessau, Halle and Magdeburg and, below the regional level, 21 districts (Landkreise). Since 2004, however, this system has been replaced by 11 rural districts and three urban districts.

The districts are:
Altmarkkreis Salzwedel
Anhalt-Bitterfeld
Börde
Burgenlandkreis
Harz
Jerichower Land
Mansfeld-Südharz
Saalekreis
Salzlandkreis
Stendal
Wittenberg

The independent cities are:
Dessau-Roßlau
Halle (Saale)
Magdeburg

Largest towns

The largest towns in Saxony-Anhalt as of 31 December 2021:

History

Saxony-Anhalt is a federal state with a relatively short history, if compared to other German federal states. It was formed in 1945 out of former Prussian territories and mainly consists of three distinct historical regions: the area around Magdeburg, the formerly independent Anhalt and a southern part which once was part of Saxony but had been annexed by Prussia in the 19th century. This historical origin can still be seen in the coat of arms of the federal state.

In April 1945 the US Army took control of most of the western and northern area of the future Saxony-Anhalt. The U.S. Group Control Council, Germany (a precursor of the OMGUS) appointed the first non-Nazi officials in leading positions in the area. Erhard Hübener, put on leave by the Nazis, was reappointed Landeshauptmann (state governor). By early July the US Army withdrew from the former Prussian Province of Saxony to make way for the Red Army to take it as part of the Soviet occupation zone, as agreed by the London Protocol in 1944.

On 9 July the Soviet SVAG ordered the merger of the Free State of Anhalt, Halle-Merseburg, the governorate of Magdeburg (in its then borders), Allstedt (before Thuringia) and some Brunswickian eastern exclaves and salients (Calvörde and the eastern part of the former Blankenburg district) with the Province of Saxony. The previously Saxon Erfurt governorate had become a part of Thuringia.

Anhalt takes its name from Anhalt Castle near Harzgerode; the origin of the name of the castle remains unknown. Anhalt was once an independent German federal state dating back for centuries.

The SVAG appointed Hübener as president of the provincial Saxon administration, a newly created function. The administration was seated in Halle an der Saale, which became the capital, also of later Saxony-Anhalt until 1952. On 3 September 1945 the new administration enacted by Soviet-inspired ordinance the mass expropriations, mostly hitting holders of large real estates, often of noble descent.

On the occasion of the first (and one and only) election in the Soviet zone, allowing parties truly to compete for seats in provincial and state parliaments, on 20 October 1946, the Province of Saxony was renamed as the Province of Saxony-Anhalt, taking the prior merger into account. On 3 December 1946 the members of the new provincial parliament elected Hübener the first minister-president of Saxony-Anhalt with the votes of CDU and Liberal Democratic Party of Germany (LDPD). Thus he became the only governor in the Soviet zone, who was not a member of the communist Socialist Unity Party of Germany (SED). He was an inconvenient governor for the Soviet rulers.

After the official Allied decision to dissolve the Free State of Prussia, which had remained in limbo since the Prussian coup of 1932, its former provinces, in as far as they still existed, achieved statehood, thus the province emerged into the State of Saxony-Anhalt on 6 October 1947. It became part of the German Democratic Republic (East Germany) in 1949. From 1952 on the East German states were dissolved, and Saxony-Anhalt's territory was divided into the East German districts of Halle and Magdeburg, except that the territory around Torgau was assigned to Leipzig. In 1990, in the course of German reunification, the districts were reintegrated as a state. But, territory around Torgau did not return to the state and joined Saxony. Now, Torgau is the centre of Nordsachsen district (since 2008).

In 2015 the skeletal remains of an ancient inhabitant of Karsdorf dated from the Early Neolithic (7200 BP) were analysed; he turned out to belong to the paternal T1a-M70 lineage and maternal lineage H1.

Demographics
Since German reunification, there has been a continuous downward trend in the population of Saxony-Anhalt. This is partly due to outward migration and partly because the death rate exceeds the birth rate. Although the birth rate has been steady since 1994, the net reproduction rate is only approximately 70%. However, the total fertility rate reached 1.50 in 2014, the highest value since 1990.

Religion

The region has historically been associated with the Lutheran faith, but under Communist rule, church membership was strongly discouraged and much of the population disassociated itself from any religious body. Saxony-Anhalt contains many sites tied to Martin Luther's life, including Lutherstadt Eisleben and Lutherstadt Wittenberg.

In 2018, the majority of citizens in Saxony-Anhalt were irreligious and more were leaving the churches than entering them – in fact, Saxony-Anhalt is the most irreligious state in Germany. Of the Saxon-Anhaltish, 15.2% adhered to the major denominations of Christianity (11.9% were members of the Evangelical Church in Germany and 3.3% were Catholics), 2% were members of other religions (mostly Islam, Judaism, the New Apostolic Church and Mandeism). Of the citizens of Saxony-Anhalt, 82.8% were religiously unaffiliated. As of July 2019 there were 1,892 Jehovah's Witnesses (publishers) in Sachsen-Anhalt. Originally their branch office for Germany was in Magdeburg. When World War II ended in 1945, the property in Magdeburg, then part of East Germany, was returned and the branch was reestablished. But on 30 August 1950 Communist police stormed the facilities and arrested the workers, and the Jehovah's Witnesses in the German Democratic Republic (DDR) were banned.

Foreigners

The percentage of foreigners in Saxony-Anhalt was 4.9 percent by 31 December 2018, the third lowest among the 16 states of Germany (together with Saxony and Thuringia).

The largest foreign resident groups by 31 December 2019 were:

Politics

List of minister presidents

Ministry of Finance

Landtag

2021 state election

Minister-president Reiner Haseloff (CDU) retained his position in a coalition with former partner SPD and newly the FDP. Before the election the coalition had consisted of the CDU, SPD and Greens.

Economy

The gross domestic product (GDP) of the state was 62.7 billion euros in 2018, which accounts for 1.9% of Germany's total economic output and ranks 13th among the 16 German states. GDP per capita adjusted for purchasing power was 26,000 euros or 86% of the EU27 average in the same year. The GDP per employee was 88% of the EU average. The GDP per capita was the second lowest of all German states.

Development
Saxony-Anhalt was part of the communist German Democratic Republic. After the breakdown of communism and the German reunification in 1990, the collapse of non-competitive former GDR industries temporarily caused severe economic problems. In 2000, Saxony-Anhalt had the highest unemployment rate of all German states, at 20.2%.

However, the process of economic transformation towards a modern market economy seems to be completed. Massive investments in modern infrastructure have taken place since 1990, and the remaining and newly created businesses are highly competitive. For example, the industry has doubled its share of international revenue from 13 percent in 1995 to 26 percent in 2008. Meanwhile, the unemployment rate has fallen considerably. By 2010 the GDP of Saxony-Anhalt was almost two and a half times higher than it was in 1991.

Even though part of this recovery was induced by the quite good performance of the Germany economy, Saxony-Anhalt did not only follow the national trend, but clearly outperformed other German states. For example, it got ahead of three German states in terms of unemployment (10.8%, as of September 2011): the German capital and city-state of Berlin (12.7%), the city-state Free Hanseatic City of Bremen (11.3%) and Mecklenburg-Western Pomerania (11%).

The unemployment began to fall under 10% in 2016 and stood at 7.1% in October 2018.

Structure
The chemical industry is quite important, with almost 25,500 employees across 214 plants in 2010. One of the biggest chemical producing areas can be found around the city of Bitterfeld-Wolfen. Because of the chemical industry, Saxony-Anhalt attracts more foreign direct investments than any other state in eastern Germany.
The state is the location of numerous wind farms producing wind-turbine energy.
Saxony-Anhalt is also famous for its good soil. Hence, the food industry has an important role with almost 19,500 employees across 190 plants in 2010. Some of the best known products are Baumkuchen from Salzwedel and Halloren chocolate globes from Germany's oldest chocolate factory in Halle.

Tourism

Saxony-Anhalt has seven World Heritage Sites, the highest number of all states in Germany.

Education

Saxony-Anhalt has several universities, including:

Anhalt University of Applied Sciences
Harz University of Applied Studies
Magdeburg-Stendal University of Applied Sciences
Martin Luther University of Halle-Wittenberg
Merseburg University of Applied Sciences
Otto von Guericke University Magdeburg

Anthem
"Lied für Sachsen-Anhalt" ("Song for Saxony-Anhalt")
Motto: "Land of the Early Risers"

See also

Outline of Germany

References

External links

Official governmental portal
Official Directory

 
1990 establishments in Germany
NUTS 1 statistical regions of the European Union
States and territories established in 1990
States of Germany